Jože Šlibar (born 18 March 1934) is a Yugoslav former ski jumper.

Career
On 24 February 1961, he set the ski jumping world record at 141 metres (463 ft) in Oberstdorf, West Germany, which he held and shared for the next three years together with Peter Lesser and Kjell Sjöberg. 

It was Yugoslav record until 1969. His best performance at Four Hills Tournament in 1959/60 was 14th place overall. In 1962 he performed at World Championships in Zakopane where he took 31st place at normal and 47th place at large hill. In 2012 he was inducted into Slovenian Athletes Hall of Fame which was founded one year earlier.

Four Hills Tournament

Overall standings

Ski jumping world record

References

External links

1934 births
Living people
Yugoslav male ski jumpers